The 2018–19 UEFA Youth League knockout phase (play-offs and round of 16 onwards) began on 19 February and concluded on 29 April 2019 with the final at Colovray Stadium in Nyon, Switzerland. It decided the champions of the 2018–19 UEFA Youth League. A total of 24 teams competed in the knockout phase (play-offs and round of 16 onwards).

Times are CET/CEST, as listed by UEFA (local times, if different, are in parentheses).

Qualified teams

UEFA Champions League Path

Domestic Champions Path

Format
The knockout phase (play-offs and round of 16 onwards), played as a single-elimination tournament, involved 24 teams: 16 teams which qualified from the UEFA Champions League Path (eight group winners and eight group runners-up), and eight teams which qualified from the Domestic Champions Path (eight second round winners):
The eight group winners from the UEFA Champions League Path entered the round of 16.
The eight group runners-up from the UEFA Champions League Path and the eight second round winners from the Domestic Champions Path entered the play-offs. The eight play-off winners advanced to the round of 16.

Each tie was played over a single match. If the score was tied after full time, the match was decided by a penalty shoot-out (no extra time was played).

On 17 July 2014, the UEFA emergency panel ruled that Ukrainian and Russian clubs would not be drawn against each other "until further notice" due to the political unrest between the countries.

Schedule
All draws were held at UEFA headquarters in Nyon, Switzerland.

Play-offs

The draw for the play-offs was held on 17 December 2018, 14:15 CET (UTC+1), at the UEFA headquarters in Nyon, Switzerland. The eight second round winners from the Domestic Champions Path were drawn against the eight group runners-up from the UEFA Champions League Path, with the teams from the Domestic Champions Path hosting the match. Teams from the same association could not be drawn against each other.

The play-offs were played on 19 and 20 February 2019. The eight play-off winners advanced to the round of 16, where they were joined by the eight group winners from the UEFA Champions League Path.

|}

Bracket (round of 16 onwards)

The draw for the round of 16 onwards was held on 22 February 2019, 14:00 CET (UTC+1), at the UEFA headquarters in Nyon, Switzerland. The mechanism of the draws for each round was as follows:
In the draw for the round of 16, there were no seedings, and the 16 teams (eight UEFA Champions League Path group winners and eight play-off winners) were drawn into eight ties. Teams from the same UEFA Champions League Path group could not be drawn against each other, but teams from the same association could be drawn against each other. The draw also decided the home team for each round of 16 match.
In the draws for the quarter-finals onwards, there were no seedings, and teams from the same UEFA Champions League Path group or the same association could be drawn against each other (the identity of the quarter-final winners and onwards was not known at the time of the draws). The draws also decided the home team for each quarter-final, and which quarter-final and semi-final winners were designated as the "home" team for each semi-final and final (for administrative purposes as they were played at a neutral venue).

Round of 16

The round of 16 matches were played on 6, 12 and 13 March 2019.

|}

Quarter-finals

The quarter-finals were played on 2 and 3 April 2019.

|}

Semi-finals

The semi-finals were played on 26 April 2019 at Colovray Stadium, Nyon.

|}

Final

The final was played on 29 April 2019 at Colovray Stadium, Nyon.

Notes

References

External links

3
February 2019 sports events in Europe
March 2019 sports events in Europe
April 2019 sports events in Europe